The Oklahoma City Zoo and Botanical Garden is a zoo and botanical garden located in Oklahoma City's Adventure District in northeast Oklahoma City, Oklahoma.

It is open every day except Thanksgiving and Christmas. The Oklahoma City Zoo is an accredited member of the Association of Zoos and Aquariums and the American Alliance of Museums.

Exhibits
 Sanctuary Asia: an Asian-themed section; which, right now, is home to the zoo's herd of Asian elephants. The elephant habitat is located in the southeast area of the zoo by Great EscApe, the state-of-the-art exhibit includes three spacious outdoor yards, pools, a waterfall, shade structures and barn with amenities including views into the barn from a raised boardwalk.
The Children's Zoo: a place where children can explore and play, while connecting with nature and animals. Featuring Galápagos tortoises, flamingos, goats, monkeys, a play stream, and lorikeets.
 Great EscAPE: includes two troops of gorillas, one family of orangutans, and a community of chimpanzees, in tropical rainforest plantings.
 Cat Forest/Lion Overlook: contains species of big and small cats including African lions, and tigers, with more than 4,000 plants replicating native environments.
 Oklahoma Trails: Its total area is  featuring animals native to Oklahoma, including black bears, alligators, bison, and over two dozen snakes. It includes a walk-in bird exhibit and a barn, which houses bats, skunks, and owls.
 Aquaticus: home to California sea lions.
 Butterfly Garden: this lush outdoor garden area has a range of butterflies, including the monarch butterfly, the painted lady, the giant swallowtail, and the eastern black swallowtail, within an environment of more than 15,000 plants.
 Herpetarium with over 80 exhibits.

Other attractions within the zoo include the giraffe feeding platform, the Elephant Express tram, the Endangered Species Carousel, the Sea Lion Presentation, Stingray Bay, Wild Encounters, elephant presentations, and the Jungle Gym Playground.

Surrounding the zoo are the Zoo Amphitheater, Lincoln Park, Northeast Lake and the Lincoln Park Golf Course. The zoo is located Oklahoma City's Adventure District at the crossroads of I-35 and I-44. Other attractions in the Adventure District are the National Cowboy and Western Heritage Museum, Science Museum Oklahoma (formerly called the Omniplex), the ASA National Softball Hall of Fame, and Remington Park Racing/Casino.

Reptiles/amphibians
 Abaco Island boa
 Alligator snapping turtle
 Amazon Basin emerald tree boa
 Amazon tree boa
 American alligator
 Argentine horned frog
 Barred tiger salamander
 Bicolor poison dart frog
 Black-tailed rattlesnake
 Black rat snake
 Black tree monitor
 Boa constrictor
 Common snake-necked turtle
 Crocodile monitor
 Diamond python
 Eastern copperhead
 Eastern diamondback rattlesnake
 Eyelash palm pitviper
 Fijian banded iguana
 Gila monster
 Green anaconda
 Green and black poison dart frog
 Green tree python
 King cobra
 Lake Titicaca frog
 Madagascar tree boa
 Massasauga
 Prairie rattlesnake
 Red spitting cobra
 Red-eared slider
 Reticulated python
 Rock rattlesnake
 Shield-nosed cobra
 Sidewinder
 Speckled rattlesnake
 Suriname toad
 Timber rattlesnake
 Volcán Alcedo giant tortoise
 Western cottonmouth
 Western diamondback rattlesnake
 Western green mamba
 Western pygmy rattlesnake
 White's tree frog
 Woma python
 Woodhouse's toad

Mammals

 Addra gazelle
 African lion
 African wild dog
 American beaver
 American bison
 American black bear
 Asian elephant
 Bat-eared fox
 Black-footed cat
 Black-handed spider monkey
 Black-tailed prairie dog
 Bobcat
 California sea lion
 Caracal
 Cheetah
 Chimpanzee
 Clouded leopard
 Common raccoon dog
 Cougar
 Coyote
 Crested porcupine
 Donkey
 Dromedary camel
 Elk
 Fishing cat
 François' langur
 Giant anteater
 Goat (petting zoo)
 Goeldi's monkey
 Golden-headed lion tamarin
 Grevy's zebra
 Grizzly bear
 Harbor seal
 Hoffmann's two-toed sloth
 Indian rhinoceros
 Jaguar
 Meerkat
 North American river otter
 Ocelot
 Okapi
 Opossum
 Pig (petting zoo)
 Red panda
 Red river hog
 Red-rumped agouti
 Reticulated giraffe
 Ringtail cat
 Serval
 Sheep (petting zoo)
 Southern three-banded armadillo
 Squirrel monkey
 Striped skunk
 Sumatran orangutan
 Sumatran tiger
 Swift fox
 Western lowland gorilla
 White-tailed deer
 Yellow-backed duiker

Birds

 African pygmy falcon
 American crow
 American flamingo
 American white ibis
 Andean condor
 Argentine ruddy duck
 Australian magpie
 Bald eagle
 Bali mynah
 Bare-faced ground dove
 Barn owl
 Black-bellied whistling duck
 Black-capped lory
 Black-naped fruit dove
 Black-necked stilt
 Blue-and-yellow macaw
 Blue-crowned motmot
 Bufflehead
 Burrowing owl
 Chicken (petting zoo)
 Chilean flamingo
 Cinnamon teal
 Cinereous vulture
 Coconut lorikeet
 Collared finch-billed bulbul
 Crested wood partridge
 East African crowned crane
 Eastern screech owl
 Edwards's pheasant
 Egyptian goose
 Eurasian eagle owl
 Great horned owl
 Greater roadrunner
 Killdeer
 Lark sparrow
 Laughing kookaburra
 Laysan teal
 Lesser white-fronted goose
 Madagascar buttonquail
 Mallard duck
 Mandarin duck
 Marbled teal
 Mourning dove
 Nene goose
 Northern bobwhite
 Northern cardinal (in the Trail's aviary and in the wild)
 Northern flicker
 Northern mockingbird
 Northern pintail
 Ostrich
 Pheasant pigeon
 Philippine duck
 Rainbow lorikeet
 Red-and-green macaw
 Red-billed blue magpie
 Red-billed hornbill
 Red-crested pochard
 Red-throated bee-eater
 Ringed teal
 Ring-necked pheasant
 Ruddy shelduck
 Sandhill crane
 Scissor-tailed flycatcher
 Southern cassowary
 Southern screamer
 Sun conure
 Superb starling
 Swainson's lorikeet
 Swan goose
 Tawny frogmouth
 Turkey vulture
 Von der Decken's hornbill
 Western meadowlark
 Wild turkey
 White-crested laughingthrush
 White-crowned robin-chat
 White-faced whistling duck
 White-necked raven
 White-vented bulbul
 Wrinkled hornbill
 Wood duck
 Yellow-breasted ground dove

Invertebrates
 Arizona blond tarantula
 Chaco golden knee tarantula
 Madagascar hissing cockroach
 Monarch butterfly (at the butterfly gardens)

Fish

 Blue catfish
 Bluegill
 Channel catfish
 Freshwater drum
 Largemouth bass
 Smallmouth bass
 Spotted gar
 Striped bass
 White bass
 White crappie

Former exhibits
Dolphinarium: The zoo kept bottlenose dolphins from 1986 until 2001. To prevent further dolphin deaths, the dolphins were returned to Mississippi, and the exhibit now hosts sea lions.
Monkey Island: Located at the entrance, monkeys would play, eat, and even sleep on a specially made island that was dug down into the ground. Opened in 1935 and dismantled in 1998. The decision was made to get rid of it because zoo visitors would either drop or throw hazardous materials on to the island, and the monkeys would choke. The island was closed and filled in. Today, there is a plaza at the entrance, with a gift shop, a restaurant, and the ZooFriends' office surround a floor where monkey island once was. From 1935 to 1985, there was a ship on the island.
Primate House: Built in the 1950s. The apes were kept there until 1993. In 1993, the apes were given a more natural habitat. The building was torn down and the Canopy Food Court was built in its place.

Famous denizens
Malee was an Asian elephant born April 15, 2011, weighing 300 pounds, the child of one of the Oklahoma City Zoo's elephants, Asha, and a male elephant named Sneezy who lives at the Tulsa Zoo. The Zoo held birthday parties for her every year. On September 30, 2015, zookeepers noticed discoloration of her trunk. After two failed treatments, she died at 4 AM CST on October 1, 2015. The cause of death was determined to be elephant endotheliotropic herpesvirus, which the other elephants at the zoo aside from her sister Achara also had.
“Judy” the Elephant

Gallery

See also
 List of botanical gardens and arboretums in the United States

Notes

References

External links

Botanical gardens in Oklahoma
Zoos in Oklahoma
Culture of Oklahoma City
Protected areas of Oklahoma County, Oklahoma
Tourist attractions in Oklahoma City
Zoos established in 1902